There have been three baronetcies created for persons with the surname Holden, all in the Baronetage of the United Kingdom. Two of the creations are extant as of 2010.

The Holden Baronetcy, of Oakworth House in Keighley in the County of York, was created in the Baronetage of the United Kingdom in 1893 for the inventor, manufacturer and Liberal politician Isaac Holden. He had previously represented Knaresborough, Northern West Riding of Yorkshire and Keighley in Parliament. His eldest son, the second Baronet, represented Bradford East and Buckrose in the House of Commons. On 4 July 1908, he was raised to the peerage as Baron Holden, of Alston in the County of Cumberland. The barony became extinct on the death of his grandson, the third Baron, on 6 July 1951. However, the baronetcy was passed on to his second cousin once removed, the fifth Baronet. He was the son of a younger son of the first Baronet.

The Holden Baronetcy, of the Grange in the County of Surrey, was created in the Baronetage of the United Kingdom in 1909 for the banker and Liberal politician Edward Holden. The title became extinct on the death of the second Baronet in 1965.

The Holden Baronetcy, of The Firs in Leigh in the County of Lancaster, was created in the Baronetage of the United Kingdom in 1919 for John Holden, twice Mayor of Leigh in Lancashire. The second Baronet was also twice Mayor of Leigh.

Holden baronets, of Oakworth House (1893)

Sir Isaac Holden, 1st Baronet (1807–1897)
Sir Angus Holden, 2nd Baronet (1833–1912) (created Baron Holden in 1908)

Barons Holden (1908)
Angus Holden, 1st Baron Holden (1833–1912)
Ernest Illingworth Holden, 2nd Baron Holden (1867–1937)
Angus William Eden Holden, 3rd Baron Holden (1898–1951)

Holden baronets, of Oakworth House (1893; Reverted)
Sir Isaac Holden Holden, 5th Baronet (1867–1962)
Sir Edward Holden, 6th Baronet (1916–2003)
Sir Paul Holden, 7th Baronet (1923-2016)
Sir Michael Peter Holden, 8th Baronet (born 1956).

Holden baronets, of the Grange (1909)
Sir Edward Hopkinson Holden, 1st Baronet (1848–1919)
Sir Harry Cassie Holden, 2nd Baronet (1877–1965)

Holden baronets, of The Firs (1919)
Sir John Henry Holden, 1st Baronet (1862–1926)
Sir George Holden, 2nd Baronet (1890–1937)
Sir George Holden, 3rd Baronet (1914–1976)
Sir John David Holden, 4th Baronet (born 1967)

References

Works cited

Kidd, Charles, Williamson, David (editors). Debrett's Peerage and Baronetage (1990 edition). New York: St Martin's Press, 1990, 

Baronetcies in the Baronetage of the United Kingdom
Extinct baronetcies in the Baronetage of the United Kingdom
Extinct baronies in the Peerage of the United Kingdom